Anthony Maurice Gifford, 6th Baron Gifford, KC (born 1 May 1940), is a British hereditary peer and senior barrister. He inherited the title of Baron Gifford on the death of his father, the 5th Baron, in April 1961.

Biography
Lord Gifford was educated at Winchester College and King's College, Cambridge, was called to the Bar in 1962 and took silk in 1983.

He was a co-founder of the North Kensington Neighbourhood Law Centre, Britain's first law centre. He founded Wellington Street Chambers and was its head for 15 years. He joined 8 King's Bench Walk in 1989 and has been head of Chambers since 2001. In 2006 his chambers relocated to 1 Mitre Court Buildings.

He was Counsel for Paul Hill in the Guildford Four appeals and for Gerry Hunter in the Birmingham Six appeals.

He was chairman of the Broadwater Farm inquiry and the Liverpool Eight inquiry, both of which investigated patterns of alleged racism and discrimination. He represented the family of James Wray at the Bloody Sunday Inquiry.

Cases in which he has been engaged include appeals involving trade unions, libel, contract and tort as well as criminal law. In 1991, he set up a firm of attorneys in Kingston, Jamaica, where he practises in civil and criminal law. He divides his practice between Jamaica and the UK.

He was a prominent member of the anti-apartheid group Lawyers Against Apartheid.

Lord Gifford sat on the Labour benches while in the House of Lords. The passing of the House of Lords Act 1999 removed his automatic right to sit in parliament, and he was excluded on 11 November 1999.

Reparations campaign
Gifford has campaigned in favour of reparations for slavery. He is a member of the Jamaican reparations commission and has said of the reparations issue: "I would like to see it approached on a Caribbean-wide basis."

Family life 
Lord Gifford married first on 22 March 1965 Katherine Ann Mundy, daughter of Dr Max Mundy of 75 Bedford Gardens, London.
They divorced in 1988 and had two children:

The Hon. Thomas Adam Gifford (born 1 December 1967)
The Hon. Polly Ann Gifford (born 31 March 1969)

Lord Gifford married secondly on 24 September 1988 Elean Roslyn Thomas, daughter of Right Reverend Bishop David Thomas of Kingston, Jamaica. They divorced and had one daughter:

The Hon. Sheba Chanel Gifford (born 1992)

Lord Gifford married Tina Natalia Goulbourne, daughter of Clement Nathaniel Goulbourne, on 11 April 1998.

Publications
(with John Davies and Tony Richards) Political Policing in Wales; 1984 (Welsh Campaign for Civil & Political Liberties); 
Where's the justice? A Manifesto of Law Reform; 1985 (Penguin Books); 
Supergrasses in Northern Ireland; 1985 (Liberty); 
Report of the Broadwater Farm Inquiry; 1986 (Karia Press); 
Loosen the Shackles: The report of the Liverpool 8 Inquiry; 1989 (Karia Press); 
The Passionate Advocate; 2007 (Wildy, Simmonds and Hill Publishing);

Coat of arms

References

1940 births
People educated at Winchester College
Alumni of King's College, Cambridge
English barristers
Living people
20th-century King's Counsel
Reparations for slavery
Barons in the Peerage of the United Kingdom
English King's Counsel
Labour Party (UK) hereditary peers
Gifford